Telangana Jagarana Sena is an outfit launched by the Telangana Rashtra Samithi, an Indian political party striving to establish a separate Telangana state within the boundaries of India, on 10 September 2005.

The goal behind the forming of the TJS was, according to TRS, to "counter anti-Telangana forces". TJS sainiks wears a white uniform and pink scarfs (pink is the colour of TRS). The sainiks are training in using lathis. TRS leader A. Narendra has however stated that TJS are willing to take up AK-47s in the struggle for Telangana statehood, a statement that provoked criminal charges against him.

TJS has been accused of being 'the militant wing of TRS'. TRS leaders have however claimed that TJS are committed to working within the limits of the Indian Constitution.

The Chief Commander of TJS(Telangana Jagarana Sena) is Koride Umakanth, a former Rashtriya Swayamsevak Sangh activist.

The TRS formally launched TJS(Telangana Jagarana Sena) on 10 September to counter anti-Telangana forces, by organising a full-fledged training camp for lathi-wielding cadres. 'Chief Commander' Koride Umakanth, a former RSS vibhag pramukh at Hyderabad, heads the Sena.

The first batch of 600 'preraks' (motivators) of TJS was given basic induction training at a drill. They would be imparted training in martial arts.

The volunteers, donning white shirts and trousers and pink scarves (khanduvas), carried full-length lathis on their shoulders. Chandrasekhar Rao and Union Minister of State for Rural Development A Narendra, led the inaugural parade at the three-day camp.

References 

Telangana Rashtra Samithi
2005 establishments in Andhra Pradesh